Valdemar Rodrigues Martíns, best known as Oreco, (born in Santa Maria, Rio Grande do Sul, June 13, 1932 – April 3, 1985 in Ituverava, São Paulo) was a footballer who was on the winning team of the 1958 FIFA World Cup.

Clubs
 Internacional (Santa Maria): 1949
 Internacional: 1950–1957
 Corinthians: 1957–1965
 Millonarios: 1965–1968
 Toluca: 1968–1970
 Dallas Tornado: 1970–1972

Honours
 Campeonato Gaúcho Champions: five times (1950, 1951, 1952, 1953 and 1955).
 1958 FIFA World Cup, with Brazil national team.
 Mustang Cup (Colombian League): 1966
 NASL Championship: 1971.

External links
 NASL Stats

1932 births
1985 deaths
Sportspeople from Rio Grande do Sul
Brazilian footballers
Brazilian expatriate footballers
Association football forwards
Sport Club Internacional players
Sport Club Corinthians Paulista players
Millonarios F.C. players
Deportivo Toluca F.C. players
Categoría Primera A players
Brazil international footballers
1958 FIFA World Cup players
FIFA World Cup-winning players
North American Soccer League (1968–1984) players
Dallas Tornado players
Expatriate footballers in Colombia
Expatriate footballers in Mexico
Expatriate soccer players in the United States
Brazilian expatriate sportspeople in Colombia
Brazilian expatriate sportspeople in Mexico
Brazilian expatriate sportspeople in the United States
People from Ituverava